Graduate School of International Development (GSID) is a Faculty of Nagoya University. It pursues a mission of encouraging intellectuals to address global issues through innovative thinking based on a sustainable social science perspective. This is accomplished through the following three objectives:
Promote empirical research based on social science theories and methods that can inform the policy-making and implementation processes of the international community, governments, and civil society;
Train professionals who can contribute to state- or community-building cooperation with the international community and with a full understanding of national and local realities; and
Expand [the university's] worldwide network with governments, universities, and international organizations through research and teaching in order to realize sustainable development and just societies on the global level.

GSID offers a master's and doctoral degree through its Department of International Development and Cooperation. There are five degree programs:

 Economic Development Policy and Management
 Peace and Governance
 Inclusive Society and State
 Education and Human Resource Development
 Poverty and Social Policy

Additionally, there is a special program for Global Business Professionals, which is a one-year master's program.

References

External links
GSID website

University departments in Japan